Corallorhiza maculata, or spotted coralroot, is a North American coralroot orchid.  It has three varieties: C. maculata var. occidentalis (western spotted coralroot), C. maculata var. maculata (eastern spotted coralroot or summer coralroot), and C. maculata var. mexicana. It is widespread through Mexico, Guatemala, Canada, St. Pierre & Miquelon, and much of the western and northern United States (though generally absent from the Great Plains and from the lowland parts of the Southeast). It grows mostly in montane woodlands.

Description 

Corallorhiza maculata is a myco-heterotroph; it lacks chlorophyll and obtains energy by parasitizing the mycelium of fungi in the family Russulaceae. The rhizome and lower stem are often knotted into branched coral shapes. The stem is usually red or brown in color, but occasionally comes in a light yellow or cream color. There are no leaves and no photosynthetic green tissues. The stems bear dark red scales and intricate orchid flowers.

Corallorhiza maculata flowers are small and emerge regularly from all sides of the stem. The sepals are dark red or brown tinged with purple, long and pointed. The side petals are reddish, and the lip petal is bright clean white with deep red spots. In some varieties, the lip may be plain white without spots.

Uses 
Several Native American groups historically used the orchid's stems dried and brewed as a tea for such maladies as colds, pneumonia, and skin irritation.

Corallorhiza maculata is also the topic of the poem On Going Unnoticed by Robert Frost.

References

Further reading 
 Taylor, D.L. & T.D. Bruns. (1997). Independent, specialized invasions of ectomycorrhizal mutualism by two nonphotosynthetic orchids. Proc. Natl. Acad. Sci. USA vol. 94 pp. 4510–4515.

External links 

 Jepson Manual - Corallorhiza maculata

maculata
Parasitic plants
Myco-heterotrophic orchids
Orchids of Canada
Orchids of Mexico
Orchids of the United States
Orchids of Guatemala
Flora of the Western United States
Flora of the Eastern United States
Flora of the Northern United States
Flora of the Sierra Nevada (United States)
Flora of California
Natural history of the Peninsular Ranges
Plants used in traditional Native American medicine
Plants described in 1817
Taxa named by Constantine Samuel Rafinesque
Flora without expected TNC conservation status